Colonel Sir Frederic Cardew, KCMG (27 September 1839 – 6 July 1921) was a British Army officer and colonial governor. He was Governor of Sierra Leone from 1894 to 1900.

References 

 https://www.ukwhoswho.com/view/10.1093/ww/9780199540891.001.0001/ww-9780199540884-e-194412

1839 births
1921 deaths
Knights Commander of the Order of St Michael and St George
Graduates of the Royal Military College, Sandhurst